C/o The Bartons (also called Care of The Bartons, or The Bartons in the UK and The Netherlands) is an Australian television drama series aimed at older children and young teens, which first aired in Australia in 1988.

History
The series was based on a 16-minute short film Jocelyn Moorhouse had made in 1986, after receiving a grant from the Australian Film Commission in 1985, called The Siege of Barton's Bathroom. She based the plot on something that happened to her in her youth, and named the Barton boys after her house mates she lived with at the time.

The ABC was looking for a new children's drama and Moorhouse decided to send in her short film. Revcom producer Jenifer Hooks saw it, and commissioned Moorhouse to create the series. The first episode of the series is basically a remake of the short film, but with the cast of the series.

Description
The series affectionately portrayed a suburban Australian family through the eyes of eleven-year-old Elly Barton, the only girl in a family of four children. Elly struggles with the way her authoritarian parents and her brothers treat her and prefers to retreat to the calm and peace of the old tree in her backyard. Elly herself behaves bossy and sometimes down right mean towards other children in the neighbourhood, including her best friend Anita, which sometimes gets her in unpleasant situations. The lessons that Elly learns from this, and the way they change her behaviour towards others for the positive, are a recurring theme in the series. The series is less upfront with the message it is trying to convey, often leaving this to the imagination of the viewer.

Among the new characters in the series was Anita McPherson, who is based on Moorhouse' real life childhood best friend in both name and appearance.

Cast
 Olivia Harkin – Elly Barton
 Michael O'Reilly – Anthony Barton
Matt Day – Paul Barton
Ben Toovey – Douglas Barton
Frankie J. Holden – Robert Barton
Jennifer Jarman-Walker – Clare Barton
Rosemary Smith – Anita McPherson
Robert Essex – Mister (Laurie) Jensen
Maureen Edwards – Miss Julia "India" Snoller
Alan Lovett – Mister Snoller
Frank Webb – "Skinner" Davies
Natasha Kenneally – Susan Davies
Christian Pellone – Vince Capaletti

Production 

 Filming took place between March and mid August 1987, slightly overrunning its intended wrap date in the beginning of August.
 Moorhouse wrote nearly half the scripts for the series, with the rest written by Noel Robinson, Shane Brennan, Greg Millin, and P. J. Hogan (Moorhouse's husband, who would later direct the acclaimed Australian film Muriel's Wedding).
 Banksiawood, as featured in the series, is a fictional suburb of an unnamed large Australian city. In reality, most of the episodes were recorded in and around Glen Waverley, Monash City, a large suburb east of Melbourne.
 The city centre, library and the Monash City Council hall are clearly visible in the episode Mr. Snoller's Black Bag. One scene of that episode was recorded in the library. 
 The girls in the Banksiawood Girl Guides, as seen in the episode Beautiful Beetroot, were in reality members of the Glen Waverley Guide Troup.
 The mall seen in the episode Suspected is the Century City Walk mall on Kingsway, and the cinema in that episode is the Village Cinema that's located inside that mall.

Release
c/o The Bartons aired twelve episodes between 29 February and 17 March 1988 as part of The Afternoon Show. It only aired once in Australia, on the Australian Broadcasting Corporation's ABC Television, after which the series was sold to several European networks through Revcom Television.

Episodes

Book 
Moorhouse also wrote a children's book based on the series, also titled C/o The Bartons. The plot of the book is based on the screenplays of several episodes from the series, some merged into a single story line or more clearly connected to each other. For example, the story lines of Half-Time and Musical Rooms directly follow each other in the book (there are four episodes between them in the series) and are connected; making the fight between the boys about Paul's actions during the football match instead of annoyances during studying like in the episode.

The book explores the thoughts and motivations of the characters more deeply than the series could do, and also makes some scenes seen in the show more intense.

There are differences between the book and the series, mostly in details. Most notably, Elly is twelve years old in the book, while she's eleven in the series. Although still taking place in the fictional Banksiawood, in the book the suburb is confirmed to be part of the Melbourne metropolitan area, about a 90-minute drive from the coast. Mirandavale is situated adjacent of it, unlike in the series where it is a two-hour drive between the suburbs.

The front cover of the book features a photo of Matt Day and Olivia Harkin. The back cover features a group photo of the cast on billycarts, made during the shooting of The Great Billycart Aid Race.

In the acknowledgements Moorhouse thanks the actors that appeared in her short film and the authors of the episodes adapted for the book's plot.

The book was published by Puffin Books on 30 March 1989 under . A second book was optioned by the publisher, but was never released.

Film 
The short film that was the basis for the series and the book featured a mostly different cast from the series. Frankie J. Holden is the only actor who appears in both. Among the actors appearing in the film are Rebekah Elmaloglou as Elly, Brendan Cowell as Paul and Max Phipps as Mister Jensen.

The film has not seen a commercial release and is not available on home media.

Olivia Harkin 
Harkin was 11 years old when she was cast as Elly in 1987. A year before C/o The Bartons, she, and several other children from her school, was part of the cast of the Kaboodle episode Snow White and the Dreadful Dwarves. In 1992, she had a guest role on the Australian police drama television series Phoenix.  She focussed on stage performance after that, but did appear in a small role in the 2005 independently produced Australian short Lucy's Heart.

Below is a list of roles Olivia Harkin has played in productions categorised as "Pro-Am" by AusStage. Roles in productions categorised as "Amateur" by AusStage are not listed here, but can be found in the AusStage database.

 Chicago (20 February 2003, Erindale Theatre, Wanniassa, ACT)
 Gross Indecency: The Three Trials of Oscar Wilde (2 May 2003, Theatre 3, Acton, ACT)
 Fiddler on the Roof (19 February 2004, Erindale Theatre, Wanniassa, ACT)

References

External links

Australian Broadcasting Corporation original programming
Australian children's television series
1988 Australian television series debuts
1988 Australian television series endings